Mektoub, My Love: Intermezzo is a 2019 French erotic drama film produced, co-written, and directed by Abdellatif Kechiche. The film is a sequel to Kechiche's 2017 film Mektoub, My Love: Canto Uno, and like its predecessor, is based on the novel La Blessure, la vraie written by François Bégaudeau. It stars Shaïn Boumedine, Ophélie Bau, Salim Kechiouche, Alexia Chardard, Lou Luttiau, and Hafsia Herzi

Mektoub My Love, Intermezzo premiered In Competition at the 2019 Cannes Film Festival, and was widely panned. The film also received controversy surrounding the on-set treatment of Bau. A third and final film had supposedly wrapped filming, but is unclear of its status following legal troubles with Kechiche's production company.

Plot
In 1994, Ophélie discovers she is pregnant with her lover's child even though she is engaged and due to marry her fiancé soon. With summer at a close she contemplates going to Paris to have an abortion. She and her friends decide to spend a night at a club in Sète where she has sex with her other friend.

Cast
 Shaïn Boumedine as Amin 
 Ophélie Bau as Ophélie 
 Salim Kechiouche as Tony
 Alexia Chardard as Charlotte 
 Lou Luttiau as Céline
 Hafsia Herzi as Camélia

Production
The decision to split this film apart from the film Mektoub, My Love: Canto Uno (2017) caused Kechiche's producers to withdraw funds for post-production for both films in 2017. Kechiche did eventually find the funds necessary to finish both films, in part by auctioning off the Palme d'or he won for Blue Is the Warmest Colour (2013).

Reception
The film was critically panned upon premiering at the 2019 Cannes Film Festival. The website's critics consensus reads: "Joyless and distastefully photographed, Abdellatif Kechiche's second chapter in his romantic epic is too enamored with derrière to offer audiences a reason to care." Metacritic, which uses a weighted average, assigned the film a score of 10 out of 100, based on 11 critics, indicating "overwhelming dislike".

Controversy
The film featured a 13-minute unsimulated sex scene where actress Ophélie Bau receives oral sex from actor Roméo de Lacour and is brought to orgasm. Shortly before the film premiered at Cannes a report broke that Kechiche pressured the actors involved to consume alcohol to finish the scene despite their reluctance to do so. Bau attended the premiere of the film but left before the screening and did not attend a press conference for the film. In 2020 she revealed that she refused to attend the screening because she had requested Kechiche allow her to view the sex scene in question at a private screening before the film was publicly shown, a request which he denied.

Potential sequel
A third and final entry had reportedly finished production, however Kechiche's production company became financially insolvent calling into question his ability to complete the film, leaving it stuck in the post-production phase.

References

External links
 Mektoub, My Love: Intermezzo at Festival de Cannes
 

2019 films
2019 drama films
2010s erotic drama films
French erotic drama films
French sequel films
Films directed by Abdel Kechiche
Pathé films
2010s French films